Erwin Friebel (born 27 March 1983) is a Dutch former professional footballer who currently plays as a goalkeeper for SVV Scheveningen in the Dutch Topklasse. He formerly played for RBC Roosendaal and Almere City .

External links
 Voetbal International

1983 births
Living people
Dutch footballers
RBC Roosendaal players
Almere City FC players
Eredivisie players
Eerste Divisie players
Derde Divisie players
Footballers from Delft

Association football goalkeepers